To the Ends of the World is a 2018 French film directed by Guillaume Nicloux. It was selected to screen in the Directors' Fortnight section at the 2018 Cannes Film Festival.

Cast
 Gaspard Ulliel : Robert Tassen
 Guillaume Gouix : Cavagna
 Lang Khê Tran : Maï
 Gérard Depardieu : Saintonge
 Jonathan Couzinié : Lieutenant Maussier
 Kevin Janssens : Commandant Orlan
 Anthony Paliotti : Capitaine Sirbon
 Vi Minh Paul : Dao 
 Vianney Duburque : Armand

References

External links
 

2018 films
2018 war drama films
2010s French-language films
Films directed by Guillaume Nicloux
French war drama films
2010s French films